Aaron Rosand (born Aaron Rosen; March 15, 1927 – July 9, 2019) was an American violinist.

Life and career 
Born in Hammond, Indiana, he studied with Leon Sametini at the Chicago Musical College and with Efrem Zimbalist at the Curtis Institute of Music, where he taught from 1981 until his death. Particularly noted for his insightful and passionate performances of the romantic repertoire and his beautiful tone, Rosand recorded prolifically and appeared all over the world with many major orchestras and concert organizations.

In the 1960s he performed often at Butler University's Festival of Neglected Romantic Music, resurrecting works that had not been heard in decades and helping spearhead the Romantic Revival in music.

In an April 1970 review in The New York Times, critic Harold C. Schonberg wrote of Rosand that "Romanticism on the violin had a rebirth last night in Carnegie Hall." In the 1970s he also completed three acclaimed tours of Southern Africa.

In October 2009, he sold his 1741 Guarneri del Gesù violin (previously owned by Paul Kochanski), which he had purchased in 1957 from the widow of Kochanski, to a Russian businessman for around US$10 million. This was believed to be the highest price ever paid for a violin, and Rosand donated $1.5 million to the Curtis Institute of Music.

Rosand died on July 9, 2019, aged 92.

References

External links

 

American classical violinists
Male classical violinists
American male violinists
1927 births
2019 deaths
Chicago Musical College alumni
Curtis Institute of Music alumni
Curtis Institute of Music faculty
People from Hammond, Indiana
Musicians from Indiana
20th-century classical violinists
21st-century classical violinists
20th-century American male musicians
21st-century American male musicians
20th-century American violinists
21st-century American violinists